Mošćenička Draga is municipality in Primorje-Gorski Kotar County, Croatia. It has 1,535 inhabitants, 90.7% of which are Croats. It is situated southwest of Opatija under Mt. Učka.

Settlements

The centre of the municipality is the former fishing village of Mošćenička Draga which is today a tourist resort with two beaches, small marina and walking paths. Above Mošćenička Draga there is the hilltop town of Mošćenice. Other settlements in the municipality are:

 Brseč
 Cesare
 Donje Selo
 Donji Kraj
 Golovik
 Gornji Kraj
 Grabrova
 Gradac
 Kalac
 Martina
 Obrš
 Potoki
 Prem
 Rovini
 Selce
 Sučići
 Sveta Jelena
 Sveti Anton
 Sveti Petar
 Trebišća

Gallery

References

External links 

 
 Tourist community

Populated coastal places in Croatia
Municipalities of Croatia
Populated places in Primorje-Gorski Kotar County